László Tihanyi (born 21 March 1956) is a Hungarian composer and conductor.

Biography
László Tihanyi was born in Budapest, Hungary on March 21, 1956, and pursued musical studies at the Franz Liszt Academy of Music, Budapest, where he studied composition with Rezső Sugár and conducting with András Kórodi. Since 1979, Tihanyi serves as a devoted professor at the Academy of Music, where he acted also as vice-rector between 2000 and 2005.

He regularly conducts at home and abroad, typically 20th century classical and contemporary programmes. He appeared with all major Hungarian orchestras and significant European contemporary music ensembles, as Ensemble Modern, Contrechamps and MusikFabrik. In 1991, he participated in the production of  Maderna's Hyperion at the Festival D'Automne à Paris and the subsequent European tour. In 2002, Péter Eötvös asked him to be second conductor of his opera Three Sisters for the 2002 production for the Wiener Festwochen (besides Eötvös being first conductor himself).

In 1985, founded his own instrumental ensemble, the Intermodulation, dedicated to 20th and 21st Century music, and has been the artistic director since then. 
Tihanyi is the winner of prestigious awards, including the Erkel prize and the Bartók-Pásztory prize.

Beside being the "composer-in-residence" of the Ensemble Intermodulation, his works are performed all over Europe: the Hungarian Radio commissioned Irrlichtspiel, for violin and ensemble (a "pocket" concerto) in 1991. Then the Componensemble premiered Winterszenen (a work based on Schubert’s Winterreise). In 1992, Summer Music was dedicated to and premiered by the Ensemble Contrechamps in 1992, one of the as yet most performed chamber setting by Tihanyi. In 1994 L’Épitaph du Soldat (a short sequel to Stravinsky's A Soldier's Tale) was commissioned by Radio France, and Serenata for four instruments by Rainbow over Bath in 1996. Schattenspiel was composed for members of the Forrás Chamber Music Workshop in 1997, and premiered in its original, four-movement version in the same year in Vienna. In 1998, two Swiss foundations, Pro Helvetia and the Zuger Kulturstiftung Landis & Gyr commissioned Matrix for four hands. Atte was premiered in 1999 in Berlin by the UMZE Ensemble. The soloists were Csaba Klenyán (clarinet) and György Déri (cello). In 2002, Musikfabrik premiered Kosmos, and a number of further commissions followed, one of which was the 20 Night Meditations for 8 soloists and orchestra with double strings, that had its western hemisphere premiere in February 2007 at The Juilliard School, New York.

His commission by the Opéra National de Bordeaux and the French state for his first opera Genitrix, based on the novel by François Mauriac, premiered on November 25, 2007 in Bordeaux.

Prizes and awards
 2002 - Klaus Martin Ziegler prize of the city of Kassel, Germany
 2001 - Bartók-Pásztory prize
 1999 - "Merite culturel" prize from the Polish Minister of Culture and Science
 1997 - Erkel prize
 1986, 1988, 1989, 1992, 1993, 1998 - Artisjus prize
 1988 - Special prize of the Association of Hungarian Musicians
 1981 - Szirmai Albert prize

Main works
 2012: Clausula No. 4. - for alto flute, viola, cello and piano
 2012: Rundherum - for piano and string quartet
 2011: 50 misure a S. (50 Bars for S.) for violin and viola, Op. 56
 2011: Two Imaginary Dialogues - for ensemble
 2011: Preludie, Invocation and Postlude - for violin, viola and cello
 2010–2011: Nyolc invokáció a Hold fázisaihoz (Eight Invocations to the Lunar Phases) for viola and piano, Op. 53
 2010: Arnis - for harp solo and ensemble
 2009: Passacaglie for viola and orchestra, Op. 49
 2009: Epilegomena (Jan Jansson on the Milkyway) - for flute solo and orchestra
 2008–2009: Genitrix – 1. szvit - for tenor and orchestra
 2008: 8 Scenes from the Genitrix - for Ms, tenor, bariton and orchestra
 2001–2007: Genitrix - Opera in two acts, based on the novel by François Mauriac, libretto by László Tihanyi and Alain Surrans, text in French
 2002: 20 Night Meditations - for 8 solo instruments and orchestra
 2002: Matrix/Kosmos - for piano four hands and ensemble
 Jan 2001 - Jun 2002: Linos - for harp
 2001: Nächtliche Klauseln - for organ
 1999: Atte - for clarinet, violoncello and ensemble
 1998: Pimpalin’s Gown - A musical play for a speaking voice and six instruments, based on a tale by Alíz Mosonyi, in Hungarian
 1998: Matrix - for piano four hands
 1997: Schattenspiel - for clarinet in A, violoncello and piano
 1996: Serenata - for four instruments
 1995 - 1996: The Passing of the Neptune - for piano
 1995: Triton - for bassoon and ensemble
 1994: Epitaph of the Soldier - for seven instruments
 1992, rev. 1994: Tra duzioni - for double symphony orchestra, two small string orchestras and six female voices
 1992: Summer Music - for six instruments
 1991: Winter Scenes - for ensemble
 1991: Night Scene - for four instruments
 1989: Arkhé - for orchestra
 1987, rev. 1995: Jan Jansson’s Journey from Denmark to Denmark (A Transcendent Musical Travel in Five Scenes) - for flute
 1986: Enodios - for orchestra
 1986: Ductus for viola solo, Op. 3
 1984 - 1985: Krios (The Month of Ram) - for small orchestra
 1984: Silence of the Winds - for ensemble
 1984: Szirom (Petal) - for an optional (keyboard) instrument
 1977: Deux sonates à Olivier Messiaen (Two Sonatas for Olivier Messiaen) - for violin and piano

References
 

1956 births
20th-century classical composers
21st-century classical composers
Hungarian classical composers
Hungarian male classical composers
Hungarian conductors (music)
Male conductors (music)
Living people
20th-century conductors (music)
21st-century conductors (music)
20th-century Hungarian male musicians
21st-century Hungarian male musicians